The American Amateur Baseball Congress (AABC) is an amateur baseball organization in the United States for players from sub-teens through adults. Founded in 1935, it coordinates its programs with USA Baseball and the American Baseball Coaches Association. AABC has eight (8) age-range divisions in the U.S., Puerto Rico, and Canada. There are also five (5) single-age divisions: 9's, 11's, 13's, 15's, and 17's. In some leagues, however, all divisions are age-range and none are single-age.

Under the AABC, each league has at least four (4) teams, each of which plays at least six (6) league games. Each league's winner goes on to state-tournament play. The winner of each state tournament goes to regional play and from there to the world series.

History
See footnote

AABC's 75th annual meeting was held on October 30, 2010, in San Antonio, Texas.

Divisions
See footnote
19 (& over) Stan Musial Baseball
18U Connie Mack Baseball
17s Don Mattingly Baseball
16U Mickey Mantle Baseball
15s Ken Griffey Jr Baseball
14U Sandy Koufax Baseball
13s Sandy Koufax 13S Baseball
12U Pee Wee Reese Baseball
11s Gil Hodges Baseball
10U Willie Mays Baseball
9s Jackie Robinson Baseball
6, 7, 8 Roberto Clemente Baseball
6U Rod Carew Baseball

World Series
See footnote

Stan Musial World Series
In general
Past Champions

Connie Mack World Series
History
Past Champions

Don Mattingly World Series
2006
2010
2011

Mickey Mantle World Series
In general
2011

Ken Griffey Jr World Series
2010

Sandy Koufax 14U World Series
2009
2010
2011

Sandy Koufax 13S World Series
2011 West Michigan Broncos

Pee Wee Reese World Series
Ball fields
2009
2010
2011
2014 Dallas, Texas

Gil Hodges World Series
2007
2010
2011
2013 Hamden Yard Dogs (Hamden, Connecticut) 

2014 Bonnie Seals (Brooklyn, NY)

Willie Mays World Series
Ball fields
2010
2011
2014 Brooklyn Blue Storm

Jackie Robinson World Series
2009
2010
2011

Roberto Clemente World Series
2008
2011

Rod Carew World Series

Regions
East Central:
North Atlantic: Connecticut, Delaware, Maine, Maryland, Massachusetts, New Hampshire, New Jersey, New York, Rhode Island, Vermont, Eastern Pennsylvania, Washington, D.C., Ontario (Canada), and Quebec (Canada)
North Central:
South East Region: Alabama, Arkansas, Florida, Georgia, Louisiana, Mississippi, North Carolina, South Carolina, and Tennessee
South Plains:
West Region: Alaska, Arizona, Northern California, Southern California, Hawaii, Idaho, Montana, Nevada, Oregon, Utah, Washington, Wyoming, British Columbia (Canada), and Baja (Mexico)
Puerto Rico:

State leagues
See footnote
Arizona Amateur Baseball Association
Northern California Association of AABC
AABC South Coast Baseball League (Orange County, California)
Colorado AABC (CAABC)
Connecticut Amateur Baseball Congress (CABC)
Florida Amateur Baseball Association (FABA)
AABC of Georgia
Northeastern Kentucky AABC Association (NEKA)
Michigan Association – AABC (Michigan AABC)
Minnesota AABC
New Jersey Amateur Baseball Congress (NJABC)
New Mexico Amateur Baseball Association
New York Metropolitan Amateur Baseball League (NYMABL)
Ohio Association – AABC (Ohio AABC)
AABC of Texas
Amateur Baseball Congress of Washington (ABCW)

See also
Amateur baseball in the United States
USA Baseball

References

External links
 American Amateur Baseball Congress : About Us
Blog: All of Baseball: Connie Mack/ Mickey Mantle/ Sandy Koufax etc.

Baseball governing bodies in the United States
Youth baseball in the United States
Sports organizations established in 1935
1935 establishments in the United States